Asma Chaudhry (born 7 June 1978) is a Pakistani TV journalist and a TV news anchor.

Career 
Asma Chaudhry started her career in 2001 as a sub-editor at Jang Group of Newspapers. Asma soon got associated with the government-run PTV and worked there as a producer. She was the recipient of PTV Award for the program Vision Pakistan in 2003. Later she worked with the top rated channels of Pakistan as a producer and then anchored the program Parliament Cafeteria from the National Assembly of Pakistan with prominent political personalities of Pakistan. As a special diplomatic correspondent, she covered the AGRA summit, SAARC summit, US presidential elections 2008 and also went for special assignments in the United States, UK, India, Germany, Sri Lanka, Afghanistan, Bangladesh. Chaudhry has also participated in IVL program by the United States state department  on Documentary Productions and Film Making.

She is an anchor on the Neo News's program News Talk with Asma Chaudhry. On April 7, 2012, Chaudhry joined Dawn News as Deputy Editor Research and Analysis and Senior Anchor. Later, Aasma Chuadhary joined Capital TV (Pakistan) and became anchor of program Mumkin. She was awarded Best Female Anchor, Current Affairs, at the Pakistan Media Awards. She worked for Capital TV for one and half years. She later became part of the First Pakistani Current Affairs Channel, Channel 24 (Pakistan). She is doing News Point in the prime time slot.

Awards and recognition
 Best Female Anchor, Current Affairs at the Pakistan Media Awards in 2011.
 PTV Award for the program Vision Pakistan in 2003

References 

Pakistani women journalists
Living people
Pakistani television talk show hosts
1978 births
Pakistani television journalists
PTV Award winners
Pakistan Media Awards